Brent DeBoer is an American singer-songwriter from Portland, Oregon. He is in the bands The Dandy Warhols, Immigrant Union, and Fathead and released a solo studio album, The Farmer, in 2010. DeBoer now lives in Melbourne, with his wife Sarah and two children.

DeBoer joined The Dandy Warhols in 1998, after the original drummer Eric Hedford left the band.

Personal life 
He is a cousin of bandmate Courtney Taylor-Taylor. At the age of five he received his first drum set for Christmas.

DeBoer has contributed funds to the National Multiple Sclerosis Society as well as Pink and Blue for Two.

References

External links 
 Official website
 On Facebook

Living people
Lakeridge High School alumni
American alternative rock musicians
The Dandy Warhols members
Musicians from Portland, Oregon
1967 births
American emigrants to Australia
American male singer-songwriters
Singer-songwriters from Oregon
Immigrant Union members
American people of Dutch descent